Shahrak-e Sahab ol Zeman (also Romanized as Shahrak-e Şāḥab ol Zemān) is a village in Sorkh Qaleh Rural District, in the Central District of Qaleh Ganj County, Kerman Province, Iran. At the 2006 census, its population was 219, in 51 families.

References 

Populated places in Qaleh Ganj County